Edward Martin may refer to:

Government and politics
 Edward L. Martin (1837–1897), U.S. Representative from Delaware
 Edward Lowe Martin (1842–1912), Kansas City mayor
 Edward Martin (Pennsylvania politician) (1879–1967), Governor of Pennsylvania and U.S. Senator
 Edward T. Martin (1910–1984), American attorney, Attorney General of Massachusetts
 Edward Martin (mayor) (1936–2009), mayor of Warner Robins, Georgia
 Edward D. Martin, Assistant Secretary of Defense, 1993, 1997
 Ed Martin (Missouri politician), Missouri politician

Military
 Edward S. Martin (1840–1901), American Civil War sailor and Medal of Honor recipient
 Edward Fowell Martin (1875–1950), Australian Army brigadier general who served in World War I
 Edward H. Martin (1931–2014), vice admiral in the United States Navy

Sports
 Edward Martin (cricketer) (1814–1869), English cricketer
 Ed Martin (boxer) (1881–1937), World Colored Heavyweight Champion, 1902–1903
 Edward Martin (basketball) (1925–2002), American college basketball coach and Negro leagues baseball player
 University of Michigan basketball scandal, 1990s scandal centered on booster Ed Martin

Other
 Edward Martin (Queens') (died 1662), English clergyman, college president
 Edward Pritchard Martin (1844–1910), British engineer and steel maker
 Edward Sandford Martin (1856–1939), American journalist and editor
 Edward N. Martin, president and CEO of HJ Martin and Son
 Kwasi Jones Martin, born Edward Martin, English songwriter and producer

See also
 Albert Edward Martin (1876–1936), English merchant and politician
 Peter E. Martin (1882–1944), leading early production executive of the Ford Motor Company
 Eddy Martin (born 1990), American actor
 Edward Martyn (1859–1923), Irish activist and playwright
 Jon Edward Martin (born 1947), American historical novelist